James Monroe Deems (1818–1901) was an American composer and music educator from Baltimore, Maryland, as well as a distinguished Union Army officer during the American Civil War.  He served as lieutenant colonel of the 1st Maryland Cavalry. On July 26, 1866 President Andrew Johnson nominated Deems for appointment to the grade of brevet brigadier general of volunteers, to rank from March 13, 1865, and the United States Senate confirmed the appointment on July 27, 1866.

Deems is remembered for his composition, Nebuchadnezzar, which was the first American oratorio. His Capt. Watros Quickstep appears in the Manchester Cornet Band (4th NH Vol Infantry) Books, Set 1.

His most important legacy was his 1850 book, Vocal Music Simplified, which was one of the earliest public-school music texts in the U.S.

See also

List of American Civil War brevet generals (Union)

References

bufordsboys.com/1stMDMon.htm

External links

1818 births
1901 deaths
Musicians from Baltimore
Musicians from Maryland
American male composers
American composers
Union Army generals
People of Maryland in the American Civil War
19th-century American male musicians